Deesa is one of the 182 Legislative Assembly constituencies of Gujarat state in India. It is part of Banaskantha district.It is numbered as 13-Deesa.

List of segments
This assembly seat represents the following segments,

 Deesa Taluka (Part) Villages – Sunthiya, Chora, Ramun, Dhanavada, Bural, Kuchavada, Viruna, Vithodar, Bhachalva, Tetoda, Ramsan, Nagafana, Kochasana, Javal, Talegadh, Robas Nani, Robas Moti, Fagudra, Agdol, Sodapur, Meda, Kotha, Ghada, Dhanpura, Talepura, Thervada, Jherda, Pamaru, Gugal, Varan, Sherpura, Kunvara Padar, Kasari, Baiwada, Morthal Golia, Genaji rabari Golia, Chandaji Golia, Bhadath, Chatrala, Latiya, Vasada, Davas, Shamsherpura, Yavarpura, Laxmipura, Dama, Jorapura, Akhol Nani, Akhol Moti, Mahadeviya, Vadli Farm, Ranpur Athamno Vas, Ranpur Vachlovas, Ranpur Ugamno Vas, Kant, Rajpur, Sherganj, Kumpat, Malgadh, Dhedhal, Rampura, Odhava, Dedol, Lorvada, Vadaval, Juna Deesa, Bhoyan, Rasana Nana, Rasana Mota, Dhuva, Dharpada, Fatepura, Vasna (Juna Deesa), Sanath, Sandiya, Sotambla, Khentva, Vahara, Viruvada, Dasanavas, Deesa (M).

Members of Legislative Assembly

Election candidate

2022

Election results

2017

2012

2007

See also
 List of constituencies of the Gujarat Legislative Assembly
 Banaskantha district

References

External links
 

Assembly constituencies of Gujarat
Politics of Banaskantha district